Charles William Havens (July 12, 1903 – May 12, 1996) was an American football player and coach of football, basketball, baseball. He played professionally as a center and tackle for one season, in 1930, with the Frankford Yellow Jackets of the National Football League (NFL). Havens served as the head football coach at Western Maryland College—now known as a McDaniel College—from 1935 to 1941 and again from 1946 to 1956, compiling a record of 77–57–6. He was the head baseball coach at Western Maryland from 1938 to 1942 and again in 1947 and 1957. Havens also served as the head basketball coach at Western Maryland during the 1934–35 season.

Havens was born and raised in Rome, New York. He died of kidney failure, on May 12, 1996, at Asbury Methodist Village in Gaithersburg, Maryland.

References

External links
 

1903 births
1996 deaths
American  football centers
American  football tackles
Frankford Yellow Jackets players
McDaniel Green Terror baseball coaches
McDaniel Green Terror football coaches
McDaniel Green Terror football players
McDaniel Green Terror men's basketball coaches
High school football coaches in Maryland
Colgate University alumni
Sportspeople from Rome, New York
Coaches of American football from New York (state)
Players of American football from New York (state)
Basketball coaches from New York (state)
Baseball coaches from New York (state)